Mesorhizobium loti, formerly known as Rhizobium loti, is a Gram negative species of bacteria found in the root nodules of many plant species. Its name is a reference to Lotus corniculatus, a flowering plant from which it was originally isolated.

Genetics
The complete genome sequence of a strain of M. loti was determined in 2000.

Unusually, M. loti has two Ku genes (mlr9624 and mlr9623) instead of the usual one in each bacterial species. (Ku is involved in NHEJ repair.)

See also
Rhizobium galegae

References

Further reading
 
Type strain of Mesorhizobium loti at BacDive -  the Bacterial Diversity Metadatabase

Phyllobacteriaceae
Bacteria described in 1982